Hirendranath Sadhu (born 1 September 1915, date of death unknown) was an Indian cricketer. He played as a right-handed batsman and a left-arm medium-pace bowler.

He was born on 1 September 1915 in Chinsurah.

Career 
Sadhu's debut came for Bengal in 1939/40, playing against Bihar, against whom he helped his team to an innings victory. Sadhu's second and final first-class appearance followed nine seasons later, playing for Assam. He scored a duck in his first innings for the team and 11 runs in the second. Sadhu bowled 41 overs in his first-class career.

References

1915 births
Date of death unknown
Assam cricketers
Bengal cricketers
Cricketers from West Bengal
Indian cricketers